Agios Ierotheos Football Club is a Greek football club based in Chorafas, Peristeri, Athens, Greece.

In October 2010, police arrested 33 people following clashes between rival supporters of Agios Ierotheos and Egaleo during a Delta Ethniki match.

Agios Ierotheos appointed a new manager, Vangelis Stavrakopoulos, after a poor start to the 2017–18 Gamma Ethniki season.

Honours
 Athens FCA Champions: 3
 1980–81, 1993–94, 2015–16

References

Gamma Ethniki clubs
Attica
Association football clubs established in 1955
1955 establishments in Greece